The men's 56 kg weightlifting competitions at the 1956 Summer Olympics in Melbourne took place on 23 November at the Royal Exhibition Building. It was the third appearance of the bantamweight class.

Each weightlifter had three attempts at each of the three lifts. The best score for each lift was summed to give a total. The weightlifter could increase the weight between attempts (minimum of 5 kg between first and second attempts, 2.5 kg between second and third attempts) but could not decrease weight. If two or more weightlifters finished with the same total, the competitors' body weights were used as the tie-breaker (lighter athlete wins).

Records
Prior to this competition, the existing world and Olympic records were as follows.

Results

As weigh-in time approached, Vinci was one and a half pounds overweight. After an hour of running and sweating he was still seven ounces over the limit with 15 minutes to go. Fortunately, a severe last-minute haircut did the trick, and Vinci went on to win the gold medal.

New records

References

Weightlifting at the 1956 Summer Olympics